The Hesperiini or branded grass skippers are a tribe in the Hesperiinae subfamily of skipper butterflies. They are known as branded grass skippers because all the males in this tribe feature a black diagonal brand of scales on their forewings that exude pheromones to attract females.

Genera

References

 
Butterfly tribes